

Eclipso

Morgan Edge

Vincent Edge
Vincent Edge is a fictional character appearing in American comic books published by DC Comics.

Vincent Edge is the father of Morgan Edge. At the time when Morgan Edge was undergoing surgery following a heart attack, Vincent was at the hospital awaiting the results when a hitman cam to finish off Morgan. After being released from police custody pending his trial, Morgan returned to Galaxy Communications and found that his father took over while he was hospitalized.

As Lois Lane and Jimmy Olsen talk about Morgan Edge's book, Vincent Edge talked to Cat Grant about the morality of her actions when it comes to his son.

Vincent Edge later sexually harasses Cat Grant at Galaxy Communications. They later watch the news about Superman's fight with Bloodsport as Vincent asks Cat out on a date as a distraction from her son's death. Cat threatens him and storms out.

During the "Reign of the Supermen" storyline, Vincent Edge develops a scheme to maintain the exclusive rights to the new Superboy. He orders Tana Moon to stay close to Superboy and keep him posted about his activities. Rex Leech contacts Vincent Edge to let him know that he has hired Stinger to take out Superboy. Superboy meets with Tana Moon and Vincent Edge at 344 Clinton Street where Edge wants Superboy to have Clark Kent's apartment as he is still declared missing. In addition, Edge wants Superboy to sign an exclusive contract with Galaxy Communications. As Tana is uncomfortable with the contract, Vincent states that Superboy gets ratings from Galaxy Communications and that she can be replaced.

Cat Grant and eight other women speak on TV that they are filing charges against Vincent Edge for his sexual advances on them. Vincent is escorted away by the police.

After Cat Grant covered the story about Ramsey Murdoch's escape, Vincent Edge is impressed with it and names her the executive producer of Galaxy Communications' news division.

As Vincent Edge was planning to put together a new incarnation of Intergang, the building where he was meeting with the crime bosses was blown up by Moxie Mannheim with Edge finished off by Moxie's minion Noose.

El Diablo

Elasti-Girl

Elongated Man

Emerald Empress

Emperor Blackgate
Emperor Blackgate is a fictional character appearing in American comic books published by DC Comics. He appeared during "The New 52".

Ignatius Ogilvy is the son of a crook named Ed Ogilvy who was loyal to his employers. While in the midst of a negotiation with someone, Ed and his wife Ann were killed.

As a young boy, Ogilvy joined up with Penguin where he started out as a lookout for Penguin's men when they were attacked by Batman. While Batman warned Ogilvy to stay out of trouble, he would not comply. Soon, Ogilvy rose through the ranks of Penguin's gang and became his right-hand man. At one point, he got a deep three-lined scar on his left arm from one of Batman's batarangs. Penguin sent Ogilvy to steal some data from the bank. Ogilvy did that and had to kill a new recruit for disobeying orders by raiding a bank vault.

During the "Death of the Family" storyline, Ogilvy was put in charge of Penguin's operation when Joker recruited Penguin for his plans on Arkham Asylum. The first thing he did was save Poison Ivy from her inescapable doom when she was captured and buried alive by Penguin's men. Then he commandeered all of Penguin's operations. As Joker continues his rampage and wanting to take advantage of it, Ogilvy unleashes a gas that might be Joker venom in Gotham City. Observing the outcome of one of Joker's activities earlier in the week, Ogilvy takes on the name of Emperor Penguin. When Mr. Foschina refuses to partake in a plan to kill Penguin's enemies in a plot to blame it on Joker, Emperor Penguin uses his umbrella to kill him by cutting a grin into his face. Emperor Penguin receives the news from Ms. Finch that Batman is trying to convince the Gotham City Police Department that Joker didn't kill some of the men who were found dead. Emperor Penguin notes that Penguin's enemies are running to him for protection and that he will soon be the emperor in Gotham City. As Penguin gets his secret cache of umbrella weapons at the Gotham City Zoo to use for his revenge upon his return to the Iceberg Lounge, Emperor Penguin is expecting this as he plans to prove to Penguin that he is not untouchable as Penguin has claimed. When Penguin makes his way to his mansion and finds that his men are working for Emperor Penguin, Penguin gives him an angry call as Emperor Penguin explains his actions. Penguin discovers that the children's center that he stole from Wayne Enterprises has been named after Emperor Penguin's mother Ann. As Penguin shoots his way towards Emperor Penguin's office, Batman crashes through the roof and notes about the cache of weapons at the Gotham City Zoo. As Penguin's lawyers were killed by Victor Zsasz on Emperor Penguin's orders, the GCPD raids the estate and arrests Penguin as Emperor Penguin expected. Emperor Penguin later meets with League of Assassins defector Anya Volkova who has stolen the Man-Bat Serum from Talia al Ghul. Soon, there is an infection on Gotham City civilians where they start turning into Man-Bats upon being exposed to a contagion spiked with the Man-Bat Serum. Victor Zsasz had set off the contagion and was also turned into a Man-Bat as well. During the epidemic, Emperor Penguin sends Mr. Combustible and his men to do a series of break-ins. When Kirk Langstrom injects himself with a Man-Bat Serum that had the antidote tied to it, a new contagion was unleashed that cures everyone as an incarcerated Zsasz confesses that Emperor Penguin orchestrated the epidemic. Meanwhile, Emperor Penguin collects a favor from Poison Ivy. No longer concealing himself, Emperor Penguin robbed the First Federal Bank and looked into the security camera as he dares Batman to come after him. Batman drives to Penguin's mansion and finds Emperor Penguin in a transformed state. He had injected himself with a chemical that was made from the Man-Bat Serum, the Venom drug used by Bane, and one of Poison Ivy's plant concoctions which gave him red eyes, pointy ears, and blue skin that is as tough as bark. Emperor Penguin defeated Batman and left him hanging on a chain from a tree. As Emperor Penguin calls up the Mayor of Gotham City, Batman is freed by Penguin. Batman fights Emperor Penguin again as he works to beat Emperor Penguin into submission. Before Emperor Penguin can finish off Batman while stating that nobody can take his victories away from him, Penguin shows up and uses a firebomb umbrella to defeat Emperor Penguin. While incarcerated at Blackgate Penitentiary, Emperor Penguin was shown to have his hair burned off by Penguin's attack. He is taken by the guards to meet their boss. When he assumes that it's the prison warden, Emperor Penguin is told by the guards that it's not him and is taken to a cattle-like prisoner. As the guards bring Emperor Penguin before the "Boss", they are instructed to wait outside. The "Boss" states that there is a hierarchy in Blackgate Penitentiary and that he'll have to work his way up it. Having other plans, Emperor Penguin squeezes the life out of the "Boss" and asks to be taken back to his cell. When word of the "Boss" being killed is heard, the inmates chanted Emperor Penguin's name only for Emperor Penguin to state that he now calls himself Emperor Blackgate.

After Wrath was incarcerated at Blackgate Penitentiary and plans to have his revenge on the Gotham City Police Department, he is approached by Emperor Blackgate who would like to have a chat with him on their future plans.

During the "Forever Evil" storyline, Emperor Blackgate appears as a member of the Crime Syndicate of America's incarnation of the Secret Society of Super Villains. Because of the Crime Syndicate of America's actions, the villains are allowed to run free and each of Batman's enemies started to claim territory. When Bane raided Blackgate Penitentiary, Emperor Blackgate agreed to fight for him. During Penguin's parlay with Bane, Penguin agrees to his terms in exchange that he brings Emperor Blackgate to him. Bane turns on Emperor Blackgate where he defeats him and leaves his body on Penguin's desk for him to deal with.

Emperor Blackgate was seen when Jim Gordon was incarcerated at Blackgate Penitentiary and was taken to his cell.

Enchantress

Eradicator

Eraser
Eraser is the name of a fictional character appearing in American comic books published by DC Comics.

Leonard Fiasco was a low-grade student during his high school years where he was a classmate of Bruce Wayne. After dropping out of school, Leonard became a masked criminal known as Eraser where his full helmet resembles a pencil eraser. This identity was because of the failures he had in his school life. As Eraser, he would be hired by thugs to eliminate every trace of evidence left at the crime scene so that the police wouldn't trace the evidence back to them. He managed to give some difficulty to Batman and Robin before they apprehended him. While incarcerated, Eraser learned that crime doesn't pay.

In 2016, DC Comics implemented another relaunch of its books called "DC Rebirth", which restored its continuity to a form much as it was prior to "The New 52". In this continuity, Eraser is depicted as having an eraser-shaped head.

Eraser in other media
Eraser appears in The Lego Batman Movie. He is among the Batman villains recruited by Joker to take part in his attacks on Gotham City.

Dr. Saul Erdel

Dr. Saul Erdel is a scientist in the DC Universe.

Dr. Saul Erdel was a brilliant scientist who created a transmitter to communicate with other worlds. When he sent a transmission to Mars, a beam of energy reached across the space-time continuum, grabbed hold of J'onn J'onzz, the Martian Manhunter, and transported him to Earth. The shock of seeing the Green Martian caused the elderly scientist to have a heart attack and die in J'onn's arms.

His DC Rebirth version appeared in a flashback renamed Mark Saul Erdel.

Dr. Saul Erdel in other media
 In Justice League: The New Frontier, the film adaptation of the DC: The New Frontier comic book miniseries, Dr. Saul Erdel plays a minor role. Dr. Saul Erdel operated in an observatory outside of Gotham City's observatory. While conducting an experiment to sending radio signals into deep space, his experiment somehow accidentally teleported the Martian Manhunter (J'onn J'onzz) into his observatory. Erdel was surprised of J'onn's appearance and suffered a fatal heart attack. Before succumbing to his death, Erdel somberly apologized J'onn for stranding him on Earth and warns that human society will not take too kindly to him as people will fear him because of his appearance, and strongly recommended to him not to reveal himself and take the time to study humanity, using his image for a while before becoming a GCPD Detective.
 Erdel makes a non-speaking cameo in a flashback in Justice League: Crisis on Two Earths.

Etrigan the Demon

Sarah Essen 

Sarah Essen, also as Sarah Essen Gordon, is a character in DC Comics.

Appearing in Batman #405, part of the Batman: Year One storyline, she is a detective partnered with then-lieutenant James Gordon. A woman of German accent, her age is never revealed, but in Greg Rucka's novelization of "No Man's Land" storyline she is said to be 12 years younger than Gordon. Sarah's detective skills are shown during her attempts with Gordon to catch Batman, by guessing (correctly) that he is Bruce Wayne by virtue of his history and the money needed for Batman's arsenal. She and Gordon, who was married at the time, start a brief affair, but a corrupt Commissioner Gillian B. Loeb attempts to blackmail them; Gordon ends the affair and confesses his actions to his wife Barbara. Sarah leaves Gotham City for New York City soon afterwards.

Sarah returns in Batman #458 (January 1991), where it is explained that she had married a New York cop who was killed in drug bust. Gordon had long since divorced and the two begin a serious relationship, resulting in Gordon's proposing to her on a night when the police station is under attack by a trio of supervillains with electrical powers. The two get married in Batman: Legends of the Dark Knight Annual #2 (1992).

When James Gordon is demoted by Mayor Armand Krol in Batman #519, Sarah is given the job in his stead. Gordon later resigns from the Gotham City Police Department in the same issue. She takes on Gordon's collaboration with Batman and Robin, but does not like the job. Later, Sarah is fired from the GCPD by Krol, who is now "a lame duck" after recently losing in the mayoral election against Marion Grange. Essen is replaced as Commissioner by Andrew Howe, a close friend of Armand Krol. Grange later re-instates James Gordon as Commissioner and also re-hires and promotes Sarah to serve as liaison between the GCPD and the mayor's office.

Sarah is murdered by the Joker in Detective Comics #741, at the end of "No Man's Land" story arc. The Joker had kidnapped dozens of infants and was holding them in the basement of the police station. Sarah first reached to Joker's position. Although she has him at gunpoint, the Joker tosses an infant at her, and Sarah instinctively drops her weapon to catch the child, saving it from injury. The Joker then shoots her in the head after saying a cold "Merry Christmas"; he, for the first time in his criminal career, apparently finds no humor in her death, as he is shown frowning immediately afterwards. Batman and Gordon find the Joker with Sarah's body. Enraged, Gordon is tempted to kill him, but instead shoots him in the leg. The Joker is at first enraged by this act, screaming that he will never walk again, but then realizes the humor in it and begins to laugh hysterically because he had done the same thing to Gordon's daughter Barbara in The Killing Joke. Her stepdaughter Barbara attends her funeral, feeling regret to call her as Sarah rather than Mom.

In the Post-Infinite Crisis continuity (as seen in flashbacks in Detective Comics #875), Gordon and Essen were married much earlier, when Goedon was still a lieutenant, and she had a more active role in raising her stepdaughter.

In The New 52-rebooted DC continuity, Sarah's marriage with James Gordon never took place, even after the DC Rebirth event, but she returned in "Infinite Frontier" relaunch.

Other versions of Sarah Essen 
Sarah is an unseen presence in Batman: The Dark Knight Returns, set in alternate future. In it, she is Gordon's loving, stay-at-home wife. Gordon, as a retired commissioner, inwardly repeats, "I think of Sarah. The rest is easy", as a kind mantra. She is only glimpsed near the end, when she and Gordon embrace in silhouette. In its film adaptation of the story's second half however, she makes two brief appearances: one at home sending Gordon out for groceries, and the other embracing him having fled their home after it is destroyed by fire. She also appears when Gordon gives an retirement speech.

In issue #6 of All Star Batman and Robin the Boy Wonder, Gordon is talking to Sarah on the phone. Though he is married to Barbara at the time, dialogue indicates that Gordon still loves Sarah, since the comic is set in the same continuity of The Dark Knight Returns.

In other media 
 Essen made her live-action debut in Gotham, portrayed by Zabryna Guevara. This version is the captain of GCPD Homicide Squad and the boss of James Gordon and Harvey Bullock. In the first season, Essen becomes ally to them in several cases, such as capturing serial killers, arresting corrupt cops and participating in the fight against the mob. At the start of Season 2, she is promoted as commissioner, replacing Gillian B. Loeb, but in the second episode "Rise of the Villains: Knock, Knock", she is killed by Jerome Valeska, the leader of a gang of insane criminals named "The Maniax". Unlike the comic books, Gordon and Essen have no romantic history in the show and their relationship is strictly professional.
 Detective Sarah Essen appears in Batman: Year One, voiced by Katee Sackhoff.
 Sarah Essen appears as Gordon's wife in Batman: The Dark Knight Returns, voiced by Grey DeLisle.

Ron Evers 

Ron Evers is a character in DC Comics.

First appearing in Tales of the New Teen Titans #1, Ron Evers was the childhood friend of Victor Stone. Evers grew up in the slums of New York City. Even as a child, Ron realized that sometimes people had to do amoral, even illegal things just to survive. When he befriended Victor, they remained friends well into their teenage years. As Ron grew older, his upbringing steered him towards a life of crime. When a laboratory accident forced Victor's father Silas to turn him into a cyborg, Ron began investigating the accident. He learned that Silas Stone's employers at S.T.A.R. Labs had begun farming out Stone's cybernetic technology to military contracts. One evening, Ron decided to voice his anger by planting a bomb at S.T.A.R. Labs. Although Victor Stone suffered PTSD from his conversion, he still could not allow Ron to continue with his plan. The two fought one another and Evers fell from the roof of S.T.A.R. Labs, seemingly to his death. Victor hurled the bomb into the air where it exploded harmlessly.

Technicians from S.T.A.R. Labs found Ron's body and were able to save his life. Under the guidance of robotics engineers Elias Orr and a scientist named Deshaun, they succeeded in transforming Evers into  a cyborg just like Vic Stone. Unlike Vic, however, Ron was now the property of S.T.A.R. Labs and became the very thing he sought to destroy - an instrument for the US military.

Orr put Ron's abilities to use in the field, and he served with a military unit in the Middle East. He later returned to the United States, but was determined to avenge himself against those who created him. Unable to strike back against Orr, Evers began conducting hit and run raids against various S.T.A.R. Labs buildings in search of Deshaun. This path of destruction brought him into conflict with two teams of Titans and a second battle with his former friend Vic Stone. By the end of this conflict, Vic forcibly removed Ron's cybernetic implants, rendering him powerless.

Following this event, Evers seemingly had a moment of clarity and turned towards spirituality. He became a minister of a radical Harlem-based religious organization known as the First Church of Anti-Technocracy. Denouncing all forms of technological advancement, Evers petitioned his followers to excise all modern technology from their lifestyles. At this time, he had another encounter with Cyborg and confessed that their last battle against one another saved not only his life, but his soul. He pleaded with Vic to give up his dependency on technological enhancements so that he too might be saved.

In other media 
 Ron Evers appears in Young Justice: Outsiders, voiced by Khary Payton.
 A genderbent version of Ron, Roni Evers, appears in Doom Patrol, portrayed by Karen Obilom.

References

 DC Comics characters: E, List of